"My Mistake (Was to Love You)" is a song recorded as a duet by Diana Ross and Marvin Gaye which was the second single released off the singers' duet album Diana & Marvin in February 1974. One of the original songs featured on that album, "My Mistake (Was to Love You)" was written by Gloria Jones and Pam Sawyer, the team responsible for the Gladys Knight & the Pips' classic "If I Were Your Woman". Pam Sawyer was also the co-writer (with Michael Masser) of the Diana Ross hit "Last Time I Saw Him" which dropped out of the Top 40 just prior to the Top 40 debut of "My Mistake (Was to Love You)" in March 1974: Sawyer would subsequently co-write (with Marilyn Mcleod) Diana Ross' 1976 #1 hit "Love Hangover". 
"My Mistake" peaked at #15 on the Billboard R&B singles chart and #19 on the Billboard Pop singles chart. It reached #16 in Canada.

Background
The narrative of "My Mistake (Was to Love You)" outlines how two lovers' relationship fell apart because the man, according to the woman, felt as if "a girl loves you, you only call them weak", while the man admits that he let his lover "slip through, like grains of sand".

Personnel
All vocals by Marvin Gaye & Diana Ross
Instrumentation by The Funk Brothers
Produced by Hal Davis

Chart performance

References

1974 singles
Marvin Gaye songs
Diana Ross songs
Male–female vocal duets
Songs written by Pam Sawyer
Song recordings produced by Hal Davis
1973 songs
Motown singles
Songs written by Gloria Jones